"Almost Lover" is a song written and recorded by A Fine Frenzy, the stage name of American singer-songwriter Alison Sudol. It was released May 22, 2007 through Virgin Records as the second single from her debut studio album, One Cell in the Sea (2007). The single failed to enter the US Billboard Hot 100, but experienced success in Europe, reaching the top 10 in the singles charts of Austria, Germany, and Switzerland.

Composition
"Almost Lover" is a piano-driven pop ballad with elements of alternative rock written and composed by Alison Sudol. According to the digital sheet music published at Musicnotes.com by Alfred Publishing Co., Inc., the song was originally composed in the key of A minor and set in common time to a slow tempo of 63 BPM, with a vocal range spanning from G through C.

Critical reception
Susan Visakowitz of Billboard wrote that, although Sudol "tackles a well-worn subject" on the song, "she does so with poetic turns of phrase and a lovely, unassuming vocal" that result in "Almost Lover" creating a "lasting first impression." In a review of One Cell in the Sea, Shirley Halperin of Entertainment Weekly wrote that "attention to the dramatic works wonders" on "Almost Lover" by showcasing Sudol's vocals.

Formats and track listings

Versions
1. "Almost Lover" (Album version) 
2. "Almost Lover" (2nd Version)
3. "Almost Lover" (Radio Edit) 
4. "Almost Lover" (Radio Mix) 
5. "Almost Lover" (Video Mix) 
6. "Almost Lover" (Instrumental) 
7. "Almost Lover" (Eric Ivan Rosse Remix)

Music video
There are two music videos made for the single. The first one was directed by Laurent Briet, and sees A Fine Frenzy playing a piano in the forest, sitting in the middle of a stream. Suddenly rocks start to fly up to the sky. Later, it can be seen that parts of the piano start to detach from each other. The second video was directed by the Nee Brothers. In this version, A Fine Frenzy is behind glass doors. She plays a dirty piano as she recalls her almost lover from the past. Flashbacks can be seen of the pair on the beach. The video was later edited to feature a revised "domestic remix" of the song.

Chloe Lukasiak, a 13-year-old dancer from the television show Dance Moms, filmed a solo dance video to Almost Lover, using a cover version recorded by Jasmine Thompson in 2013. The video was directed by Director Brazil and choreographed by Brittany Pent, and it has over 3 million views (as of 2017).

Usage in popular culture
"Almost Lover" was featured on a season three episode of American reality television series, The Hills titled, "A Night at the Opera" and a season four episode of American legal comedy-drama, Suits titled, "Fork in the Road". Rolling Stone listed the Hills feature as one of the series' 15 best musical moments. The song was also used as the backing music for a performance by Courtney Galiano on season four of American reality competition program, So You Think You Can Dance, and for performances by Lisa Auguste and Corynne Barron on the first and second seasons, respectively, of the Canadian counterpart, So You Think You Can Dance Canada.

Charts and certifications

Weekly charts

Year-end charts

Certifications

Release history

References

2007 singles
Virgin Records singles
2007 songs
Pop ballads
2000s ballads